The 2012 Santos Tour Down Under was the 14th edition of the Tour Down Under stage race. It took place from 17 to 22 January in and around Adelaide, South Australia, and was the first race of the 2012 UCI World Tour.

The race was won by Australian Simon Gerrans of the  team, after taking the lead on the penultimate stage of the race and held the race leader's ochre jersey to the finish, the next day, in Adelaide. 's Tiago Machado completed the podium, eight seconds down on Gerrans.

In the race's other classifications, Rohan Dennis of the UniSA-Australia team won the black jersey for the highest placed rider under the age of 26, by placing fifth overall in the general classification, and  rider Edvald Boasson Hagen took home the blue jersey for amassing the highest number of points during stages at intermediate sprints and stage finishes; denying 's André Greipel, who won three stages during the week. Dennis also won the King of the Mountains classification, with  finishing at the head of the teams classification.

Participating teams 
As the Tour Down Under was a UCI World Tour event, all 18 UCI ProTeams were invited automatically and obligated to send a squad. Together with a selection of Australian riders forming the UniSA-Australia squad, this formed the event's 19-team peloton.

The 19 teams invited to the race were:

Schedule
The route for the race was announced on 13 June 2011.

Stages

Stage 1
17 January 2012 — Prospect to Clare, 

As such, the riders between them managed to take all sub-classification points on offer during the stage, at both of the intermediate sprints and the single categorised climb at Taylers Run.

With the field closing yet further, Dennis made a solo bid for victory from  out and was clear by around a minute before eventually being caught several kilometres later, towards the run-in to Clare. After Dennis' team-mate Will Clarke had been closed down after a late counter-attack, the field set up for a bunch sprint into Clare. In the final kilometre, a crash involving numerous riders split the field, with many hitting the ground. Three riders – 's Jürgen Roelandts, 's Matteo Montaguti and  rider Frédéric Guesdon – were taken to hospital, along with a spectator who was hit by a rider during the incident. Greipel was slightly delayed on the run-in but managed to bridge back to the front and managed to out-sprint Alessandro Petacchi to the line, and achieved his ninth stage win at the Tour to take the race's first ochre jersey. Greipel was the first leader of the sprints classification, Dennis held the lead of the youth classification, Pavarin held the mountains jersey after leading over the only climb of the day and Vorganov was named most combative rider for the stage.

Stage 2
18 January 2012 — Lobethal to Stirling, 

Just as he had done the previous day, Martin Kohler of  made it into the race's primary breakaway of the day, and was joined again by a rider from the UniSA-Australia team, with Will Clarke – fresh from a late-stage attack the previous day – joining Kohler out front. The pair extended their advantage over the peloton to eleven minutes, before Kohler sat up and elected to return to the main field.

After Clarke had been left on his own, the advantage dropped slightly to around eight minutes but after he had steadied himself for a solo escape, the gap to the main field grew once again. The gap was largely held around the ten-minute mark by the peloton, but extended out to over twelve minutes at one point, and by the time Clarke entered the finishing circuit,  in length, at Stirling for the first of three laps, it was back around ten and a half minutes. Several teams – including ,  and  – comprising many of the general classification contenders for the Tour, brought their riders towards the front of the main pack in order to try to get the gap to Clarke down to a sustainable level in order to catch him. Clarke remained ten minutes clear as he entered the second lap of the circuit and despite the panic that had set in to the teams in the peloton, he maintained a sufficient amount of energy to continue holding them off.

He entered the final lap clear by nine minutes, but was tiring dramatically as the fatigue began to set in after his lengthy exploits off the front of the field. He held on to the end of the lap and ended up taking the first victory of his professional career, and honours for most combative rider of the day. The main pack was led over the line by  rider Michael Matthews but 62 seconds in arrears, while 's Simon Gerrans completed a 1–2–3 for Australian riders on the day, just ahead of Alejandro Valverde. Kohler managed to finish within the pack to take his first race leader's jersey, while Clarke became the leader in the sprints and mountains classifications, and Matthews moved into the black jersey for youth leader in third place overall.

Stage 3
19 January 2012 — Unley to Victor Harbor, 

De Gendt earned maximum points during the stage, as he crossed the single categorised climb at Sellicks Hill ahead of his companions, and also crossed the line first at both of the intermediate sprints, gaining six seconds towards the general classification. Brammeier tried to break clear after their advantage was hurriedly reduced, but the field were back as a whole, with  remaining. With the field back together, several teams took turns on the front of the main field in order to try and break riders from the comfort of the peloton.

With all mini-attacks closed down in the closing stages, it was left to another bunch sprint for the bonus seconds on offer at the line to the top three finishers.  had looked to set up Michael Matthews for victory and a potential ochre jersey, but could not find clear space to attack, and it was left to Mark Renshaw to lead out the sprint to the line. However, André Greipel came around him in the final metres, and thus picked up his second stage win of the week, and his tenth career victory at the Tour Down Under; with the bonus seconds, it allowed him to retake the ochre jersey from Martin Kohler. Greipel also regained the lead of the sprints classification, Matthews maintained the lead of the youth classification, and De Gendt took both the mountains jersey and the most combative rider honours for the stage.

Stage 4
20 January 2012 — Norwood to Tanunda, 

Mini-attacks set the course for the early running of the stage as the field remained as one prior to the first intermediate sprint of the day, coming after , in the town of Kersbrook. It was not until after the intermediate sprint that the stage's primary breakaway had been formed. Their advantage rarely threatened the main field however, as the peak gap that the four riders out front had, was just over four minutes.

Smukulis quickly dropped back and left his three companions to make the pace out front.  provided the pace in the peloton, and with that speed, it allowed the field to catch the trio out front with around  left to run of the parcours, and prior to the final climb of the day at Mengler Hill. With  and  still pressurising the field as they were on the climb itself, many riders became dislodged at the back of the peloton due to their nature of the attack. Among those that fell from the comfort zone were race leader Greipel and 's Thomas De Gendt, who had been in fourth place overall prior to the stage;  sporting director Matt White later stated that their aim for the stage was to remove Greipel from the race equation. UniSA-Australia rider Rohan Dennis led over the hill, to take the 16 points on offer for first place, while Greipel lost more than seven minutes by stage's end.

Just 48 riders of the 131 who started the stage remained as one to contest the finish in Tanunda. After finishing just behind Bennati, 's Edvald Boasson Hagen replaced Greipel as leader of the sprints classification, Matthews held the lead of the youth classification once again, Dennis earned the mountains jersey after earning maximum points on the final climb and Kadri was named most combative rider for the stage.

Stage 5
21 January 2012 — McLaren Vale to Old Willunga Hill, 

The race's queen stage had an added twist for its 2012 running, with the implementation of Old Willunga Hill – a  climb at an average gradient of 7.6% – as a summit finish for the first time. Again like the previous day, much of the early running of the stage was resorted to mini-attacks prior to the formation of the day's breakaway.

With strong cross-winds during the stages, several teams – mainly ,  and  – looked to create a split in the field via an echelon, which was ultimately successful as the increased pace managed to shed some thirty riders from the back of the peloton, including 's Matthew Lloyd for a short period of time; also reduced was the advantage to the sextet out front, cutting their gap from over eight minutes down to the three-minute mark. Goddaert dropped away from the front prior to the first climb of Old Willunga Hill, where Haas attacked and achieved maximum points for the climb; from there, he continued his pace onto the descent. He was chased by De Gendt, whereas O'Grady dropped back in order to help with his team's challenge in the expectation of putting one of their riders into the ochre jersey. Third over the line was Rohan Dennis for UniSA-Australia, to maintain his lead in the mountains classification ahead of De Gendt. Haas was caught prior to the second and final climb of Old Willunga Hill; he was caught with around  remaining of the stage by a far reduced lead group.

,  and  featured prominently in the lead group with several riders from each team looking for a potential stage win and with many riders within a number of seconds of the overall leader, the chance of taking the leader's ochre jersey into the final criterium stage in Adelaide. One rider from each of the prominent teams joined Dennis in a quick break at the foot of the climb, however it was left to Dennis and Tiago Machado to set the pace ahead of the quickly closing peloton. Valverde and Gerrans contested a two-man sprint for the line which Valverde narrowly won, but Gerrans' second-place finish allowed him to take the ochre jersey ahead of Valverde; both riders were on the same time, but due to better cumulative stage finishes, Gerrans took the jersey. Machado finished third ahead of Rogers and Dennis, with the three riders also in that order, taking third, fourth and fifth places in the overall standings and within fifteen seconds of Gerrans' lead.

Stage 6
22 January 2012 — Adelaide (criterium), 

Sixteen riders representing thirteen teams managed to get slightly clear of the rest of the field, but their advantage never cleared a minute, and the field was back together just after the first of the intermediate sprints. Prior to the second intermediate sprint, Jan Bakelants of  attacked in the hope of gaining bonus seconds to allow him to move past  rider Edvald Boasson Hagen for sixth place overall, and went through the sprint first to pick up the three bonus seconds on offer. Bakelants was later joined by defending race winner Cameron Meyer of the  team and Romain Sicard to form the second mini-breakaway of the stage.

The trio managed to get clear by a similar distance to what the opening breakaway had achieved – around 40 seconds – and for a time, it allowed Bakelants to be the virtual leader of the race, as he trailed race leader Simon Gerrans – Meyer's team-mate – by just 16 seconds on the road. Bakelants' bid for victory ended with a lap and a half to go, and was joined by Sicard in that aspect. Meyer tried to go all-out in search of victory, and went into the final lap with an advantage over the closing field. Half a lap later, he was caught and that set up a full-field sprint to close the event. As they had done twice before in the week, it was  playing their hand best, as André Greipel was released to a third stage victory and an eleventh career win in the Tour Down Under, putting him one shy of the record held by Robbie McEwen. Second place went to 's Mark Renshaw, and third to  rider Alessandro Petacchi.

Sixth place on the final stage was enough for Boasson Hagen to claim the sprints classification; despite not winning any stages, Boasson Hagen's consistent finishing across the entire week allowed him to accumulate points from all positions, whereas Greipel's three stage wins were rarely backed up by other high finishes. Dennis held the lead of the youth classification, and also kept a hold of the mountains classification lead as Thomas De Gendt and Gerrans failed to take any points on offer for the stage, and both fell five points shy of Dennis' total. Bakelants claimed the final most combative rider of the stage award, as he managed to move into sixth place overall thanks to bonus time won on the stage.

Classification leadership table
In the 2012 Tour Down Under, four different jerseys were awarded. For the general classification, calculated by adding each cyclist's finishing times on each stage, the leader received an ochre jersey. This classification was considered the most important of the 2012 Tour Down Under, and the winner of the classification was considered the winner of the race.

Additionally, there was a sprints classification, which awarded a blue jersey. In the sprints classification, cyclists received points for finishing in the top 15 in a stage. For winning a stage, a rider earned 15 points, with one point fewer per place down to a single point for 15th place. Points towards the classification could also be accrued at intermediate sprint points during each stage; these intermediate sprints also offered bonus seconds towards the general classification. There was also a mountains classification, the leadership of which was marked by a white jersey. In the mountains classification, points were won by reaching the top of a climb before other cyclists, with more points available for the higher-categorised climbs.

The fourth jersey represented the young rider classification, marked by a black jersey. This was decided in the same way as the general classification, but only riders born after 1 January 1986 were eligible to be ranked in the classification. There was also a classification for teams, in which the times of the best three cyclists per team on each stage were added together; the leading team at the end of the race was the team with the lowest total time, and each member of the winning team received a light blue jersey on the final podium. Additionally, a red jersey was awarded on the podium each day, for the most aggressive rider, or riders, of that day's stage.

References

External links

Tour Down Under
Tour Down Under
Tour Down Under
2012 in Oceanian sport
Tour